The State of the Nation Address of the President of South Africa (abbreviated SONA) is an annual event in the Republic of South Africa, in which the President of South Africa reports on the status of the nation, normally to the resumption of a joint sitting of Parliament (the National Assembly and the National Council of Provinces).

The speech marks the opening of the parliamentary year and is usually attended by important political and governmental figures of South Africa, including former Presidents, the Chief Justice of the Constitutional Court and other members of the judiciary, the Governor of the Reserve Bank, and Ambassadors and Diplomats to the Republic. The procession of the president into the joint session is accompanied by an imbongi reciting a praise poem for the president. The address is also preceded by the entrance of members of parliament, officials, celebrities and guests into the chamber on a red carpet, which is typically broadcast on television as a showcase of red carpet fashion. Following the end of the speech, a parliamentary debate on the address is scheduled for the following sitting, followed by another sitting in which the president replies to the debate.

The 2008 SONA marked the first address after the ousting of South African President Thabo Mbeki as President of the African National Congress (ANC) by former South African Deputy President Jacob Zuma, and also the absence of both former Presidents Nelson Mandela and FW de Klerk and their respective spouses.

Titles in South African official languages

Because the Republic of South Africa has eleven official languages, the State of the Nation Address is made available, either automatically or by request, in all of the official languages and published on the website of the Government Communications and Information Service (GCiS).

 Afrikaans: 
 English: State of the Nation Address of the President of South Africa
 isiNdebele: 
 isiXhosa: 
 isiZulu: 
 Sepedi: 
 Sesotho: 
 Setswana: 
 Siswati: 
 Tshivenda: 
 Xitsonga:

See also
State of the Union Address, the United States' equivalent
State Opening of Parliament of the United Kingdom

External links
 State of the Nation Address Speeches at the GCiS
 Official web page of the 2017 SONA
 2017 SoNA on YouTube
 Page listing previous SONAs

Politics of South Africa